WPCC (1410 AM) is a radio station  broadcasting a Rhythmic Oldies/Beach music format licensed to Clinton, South Carolina, and serving Laurens County, South Carolina. The station is currently owned by Laurens County Communications, Inc. WPCC signed on an FM translator at 96.5 FM in January 2017.

Programming
Until 2014, WPCC was an ESPN Radio affiliate. The station was an affiliate of the Atlanta Braves radio network.

References

External links

Laurens County, South Carolina
PCC
Radio stations established in 1964